Aşağı Qışlaq (also Ashagy Kyshlak and Alimammed-Kyshlagi) is a village and municipality in the Shahbuz District of Nakhchivan, Azerbaijan. It is located one kilometer from the Yevlakh-Lachin-Nakhchivan highway and twelve kilometers north-east of the district center. The main sectors of industry for the village include gardening and animal husbandry. There is a secondary school, a library, a communications branch, a club, and a medical center in the village. It has a population of 917.

Etymology
Aşağı Qışlaq (Ashaghy Kyshlak) is the foothill area. While the second component of the name of Ashaghy Kyshlak technically translates to "wintering", the translation should not be taken literally, as the villages of the Yukhary (Upper) Kyshlak and Ashaghy (Lower) Kyshlak are not suitable for wintering. The name is associated with the name of one of the arms of the Gyzyl Kyshlak tribe (Orta Kyshlak, Gyullu Kyshlak, Yazly Kyshlak, Yazy Kyshlak or Dyuz Kyshlak) of the Turkic Kengerli. The name of Ashaghy Kyshlak as an ethno toponym means "the lower part of the territory", and it is inhabited by the tribe of the kyshlhak.

References 

Populated places in Shahbuz District